Elamena is a genus of crab, containing the following species:

 Elamena abrolhensis Gordon, 1940
 Elamena castanea Naruse, Mendoza & Ng, 2008
 Elamena cimex Kemp, 1915
 Elamena cristatipes Gravely, 1927
 Elamena globosa Chuang & Ng, 1991
 Elamena gordonae Monod, 1956
 Elamena gracilis Borradaile, 1903
 Elamena longidactylis Yang & Sun, 1998
 Elamena longirostris Filhol, 1885
 Elamena magnum Ng & Chuang, 1996
 Elamena mathoei (Desmarest, 1823)
 Elamena mendosa Chuang & Ng, 1991
 Elamena mexicana (H. Milne Edwards, 1853)
 Elamena momona Melrose, 1975
 Elamena panglao Naruse, Mendoza & Ng, 2009
 Elamena producta Kirk, 1879
 Elamena quoyi (H. Milne Edwards, 1853)
 Elamena rostrata Ng, Chen & Fang, 2000
 Elamena samalensis Husana, Kase & Mendoza, 2013
 Elamena simplidenta Ng & Chuang, 1996
 Elamena sindensis Alcock, 1900
 Elamena sundaica Ng & Chuang, 1996
 Elamena truncata (Stimpson, 1858)
 Elamena umerata Lucas, 1980
 Elamena vesca Ng & Richer de Forges, 1996
 Elamena xavieri Kemp, 1917

References

Crabs
Taxa named by Henri Milne-Edwards